Roosevelt High School is a public high school in unincorporated Lubbock County, Texas, United States, with a Lubbock postal address. It is part of the Roosevelt Independent School District and classified as a 3A school by the University Interscholastic League. In 2015, the school was rated "Met Standard" by the Texas Education Agency.

Athletics 
The Roosevelt Eagles compete in these sports - 

Cross Country, Football, Basketball, Powerlifting, Golf, Tennis, Track, Baseball & Softball

State Titles 
 Girls Basketball -  
 1957(B), 1965(1A)

References

External links 
 

Schools in Lubbock County, Texas
Public high schools in Texas